The Olympic Games are an international multi-sport event featuring both summer and winter sports, held every two years with Summer and Winter Olympic Games alternating. During Olympic Games opening ceremonies, the sitting president of the International Olympic Committee (IOC) will make a speech before inviting a representative from the host country to officially declare that particular Games open. The current Olympic Charter requires this person to be the head of state of the host country, although this has not always been the case. This article lists the people who have had the ceremonial duty to declare each Olympic Games open.

Opening ceremony
The IOC factsheet on the opening ceremony states: "According to the Olympic Charter protocol, the duty of declaring the Games officially open falls to the head of state of the host country. Those who have performed this task are royalty and presidents, or their representatives, whether it was a vice-president, a member of the royal family, or a governor-general". Rule 56 of Chapter 5 of the Olympic Charter sets out the exact words that are to be declared by the person opening the Games. If at a Summer Olympic Games, the words to be said are: I declare open the Games of [name of host city] celebrating the [number of the Olympiad] Olympiad of the modern era.  When at a Winter Olympic Games, the dignitary opening the Games is to proclaim: I declare open the [number of the Olympic Winter Games] Olympic Winter Games of [name of host city].  However, this has not always been followed strictly;

On 27 August 1960, Giovanni Gronchi, President of the Italian Republic, declares the Summer Olympics in Rome open by speaking in Italian:
"I proclaim the opening of the Olympic Games of Rome, celebrating the XVII Olympiad of the modern era."

On 10 October 1964, Emperor Hirohito of Japan, opened the Summer Olympics in Tokyo by speaking in Japanese:
"Celebrating the XVIII modern Olympiad, we hereby declare the opening of the Tokyo Olympic Games."

On 12 October 1968, Mexican president Gustavo Diaz Ordaz opened the Games of Mexico City in Spanish:
"Today, 12 October 1968, I declare inaugurated the Olympic Games in Mexico, that commemorate the XIX Olympiad of the modern era."

On 26 August 1972, German president Gustav Heinmann opened the Games of Munich speaking in German:
"I declare the Olympic Games Munich 1972, celebrating the XX Olympiad of the modern era, open."

On 17 July 1976, Elizabeth II, as Queen of Canada, opened the Montreal Olympics (first in French followed by the English) with:
"I declare open the Olympic Games of 1976, celebrating the XXI Olympiad of the modern era."

On 19 July 1980, Soviet leader Leonid Brezhnev opened the Moscow Summer Olympics speaking in Russian:
"Mr. President of International Olympic Committee! Comrades! I declare open the Olympic Games of 1980, celebrating the XXII Olympiad of the modern era."

On 28 July 1984, U.S. President Ronald Reagan opened the Los Angeles Summer Olympics with:
"Celebrating the XXIII Olympiad of the modern era, I declare open the Olympic Games of Los Angeles."

On 17 September 1988, President of the Republic of Korea, Roh Tae-woo opened the Summer Olympics in Seoul by speaking in Korean:
"In celebration of the 24th modern Olympic Games, I declare the Seoul Olympic Games open."

On 25 July 1992, King Juan Carlos I of Spain opened the Barcelona Summer Olympics with, following the 500th anniversary of the Alhambra Decree and exploration of the New World:
"(In Catalan) Welcome all to Barcelona. (In Spanish) Today, 25 July of the Year 1992, I declare open the Barcelona Olympic Games that celebrate the XXV Olympiad of the modern era."

On 12 February 1994, King Harald V of Norway opened the Olympic Winter Games in Lillehammer by speaking in Norwegian:
"I hereby declare opened the XVII Olympic Winter Games in Lillehammer."

On 19 July 1996, U.S. President Bill Clinton opened the Atlanta Summer Olympics with the exact format:
"I declare open the Games of Atlanta, celebrating the XXVI Olympiad of the modern era."

On 7 February 1998, Emperor Akihito of Japan opened the Olympic Winter Games in Nagano by speaking in Japanese:
"Here, I will declare the opening of the XVIII Olympic Winter Games in Nagano."

On 15 September 2000, Governor-General of the Commonwealth of Australia Sir William Deane opened the Sydney Summer Olympics with the exact format:
"I declare open the Games of Sydney, celebrating the XXVII Olympiad of the modern era."

On 8 February 2002, U.S. President George W. Bush opened the Winter Olympics in Salt Lake City (which took place five months after the September 11 attacks) using the format of the Summer Games declaration with:
"On behalf of a proud, determined and grateful nation, I declare open the Games of Salt Lake City, celebrating the Olympic Winter Games."

On 13 August 2004, Konstantinos Stephanopoulos, President of the Hellenic Republic, opened the Athens Summer Olympics by speaking in Greek:
"I declare the opening of the Olympic Games of Athens and the celebration of the XXVIII Olympiad of the modern era."

On 10 February 2006, Carlo Azeglio Ciampi, President of the Italian Republic, opened the Turin Olympic Winter Games using the format of the Summer Games declaration by speaking in Italian:
"I declare open, in Turin, the celebration of the XX Winter Olympic Games."

On 8 August 2008, Hu Jintao, the President of the People's Republic of China, opened the Beijing Summer Olympics by speaking in Mandarin:
"I declare, the XXIX Olympic Games of Beijing, open."

On 12 February 2010, the Governor General of Canada, Michaëlle Jean, opened the 2010 Winter Olympics in Vancouver using the format of the Summer Games declaration by saying in French and English: 
"I declare open the Games of Vancouver, celebrating the 21st Olympic Winter Games."

On 27 July 2012, Queen Elizabeth II of the United Kingdom of Great Britain and Northern Ireland, declares the opening of the 2012 London Summer Olympics, following the 60th anniversary of her accession to the throne, with the exact format:
"I declare open the Games of London, celebrating the XXX Olympiad of the modern era."

On 7 February 2014, Vladimir Putin, the President of the Russian Federation, declares the opening of the 2014 Sochi Winter Olympics by speaking in Russian:
"The XXII Olympic Winter Games in Sochi I declare open."

On 5 August 2016, Brazilian vice president Michel Temer, as acting president during the suspension of President Dilma Rousseff's powers and duties, opened the Summer Olympics in Rio de Janeiro by speaking in Brazilian Portuguese:
"After this wonderful spectacle, I declare open the Rio Olympic Games, celebrating the XXXI Olympiad of the modern era."

On 9 February 2018, Moon Jae-in, President of the Republic of Korea, declares the opening of the Pyeongchang Winter Olympics by speaking in Korean:
"I declare the 23rd Winter Olympic Games, the Pyeongchang Winter Olympics, open."

On 23 July 2021, Emperor Naruhito opened the 2020 Summer Olympics in Tokyo (which was postponed by a year due to the COVID-19 pandemic), following the 10th anniversary of the Great East Japan earthquake, by speaking in Japanese:
"I hereby declare the opening of the Tokyo Games to commemorate the XXXII Modern Olympiad."

On 4 February 2022, Xi Jinping, the President of the People's Republic of China, opened the Beijing Winter Olympics by speaking in Mandarin:
"I declare, the 24th Winter Olympic Games of Beijing, open."

Records

As of 2022, there have been 49 different individuals who opened either the Summer or Winter Olympic Games. Four of them have done so more than once. German führer Adolf Hitler was the first person to open more than one Olympic Games; he opened the 1936 Winter and Summer Olympics, both of which were hosted in Germany. He remains the only one to open more than one Games in the same year.

Italian president Giovanni Gronchi opened the 1956 Winter Olympics in Cortina d'Ampezzo and the 1960 Summer Olympics in Rome. He was the first democratically elected head of state to open more than one Olympic Games.

Japanese emperor Hirohito opened the 1964 Summer Olympics in Tokyo and the 1972 Winter Olympics in Sapporo. He was the first non-European to open more than one Olympic Games.

Queen Elizabeth II opened the 1976 Summer Olympics in Montreal, Canada, and the 2012 Summer Olympics in London, Great Britain. She is the first woman to open more than one Olympic Games, first woman to open any Summer Olympics, and the only one to do so in different host countries. Aside from declaring open the Games by herself, she was represented during the declaration four times: in the 1956 and  2000 Summer Olympics – both were held in Australia – as well as the 1988 and 2010 Winter Olympics – both were held in Canada.

In 1952, Princess Ragnhild of Norway became the first woman to open any Olympic Games.

Chinese president and Communist Party general secretary Xi Jinping became the first person to open both the Youth Olympics and regular Olympics, having opened the 2014 Summer Youth and 2022 Winter Games.

Dignitaries who have opened the Summer Olympics

Notes:

Dignitaries who have opened the Winter Olympics

Dignitaries who have opened the Youth Olympic Games

Notes:

See also
List of Olympic Games host cities
List of people who have kept the Olympic flag
President of the Organising Committee for the Olympic Games
President of the International Olympic Committee

References

people
Olympic Games
Olympics opening ceremonies
Olympic